The Middle Fork Kings River is a  tributary of the Kings River in Kings Canyon National Park, California, in the southern Sierra Nevada. Draining  – almost all of it wilderness – the Middle Fork is one of the largest wholly undeveloped watersheds in the state, with no dams or paved roads within its basin. The entire length of the Middle Fork is designated a National Wild and Scenic River.

Course
The Middle Fork originates at Helen Lake in the high Sierra, near Muir Pass in Kings Canyon National Park. It passes the Le Conte Ranger Station and receives Dusy Creek from the east and then the much larger Palisade Creek, also from the east, a short distance downstream. Flowing south, it enters a narrower canyon where it drops over a waterfall known as Devil's Washbowl. It receives Cartridge Creek from the east, then turns southwest through Simpson Meadow, a broad subalpine valley at about  elevation, where it receives Goddard Creek from the north.

Below Simpson Meadow the Middle Fork turns west-southwest, flowing along the bottom of the Slide Bluffs and receiving many small tributaries before reaching the dramatic glacial canyon of Tehipite Valley, one of the most isolated parts of the park. Many rattlesnakes inhabit the canyon, especially from Simpson Meadow down to the junction with the South Fork. Blue Canyon Creek and Crown Creek tumble down the north wall of the valley, forming waterfalls before they merge with the Middle Fork.

See also
North Fork Kings River
South Fork Kings River
List of rivers of California

References

Kings River Middle
Kings River Middle
Kings River Middle
Kings River Middle
Rivers of the Sierra Nevada in California
Wild and Scenic Rivers of the United States